Marco Agrippa Dandini (1558 – 20 October 1603) was a Roman Catholic prelate who served as Bishop of Jesi (1599–1603).

Biography
Marco Agrippa Dandini was born in 1558. On 2 August 1599, he was appointed Bishop of Jesi by Pope Clement VIII. On 22 August 1599, he was consecrated bishop by Camillo Borghese, Cardinal-Priest of Santi Giovanni e Paolo, with Giovanni Camerota, Bishop of Bova, and Valeriano Muti, Bishop of Bitetto, serving as co-consecrators. He served as Bishop of Jesi until his death on 20 October 1603.

References

External links and additional sources

16th-century Italian Roman Catholic bishops
17th-century Italian Roman Catholic bishops
Bishops appointed by Pope Clement VIII
1558 births
1603 deaths